Darjeeling Polytechnic, established in 1964, is a government polytechnic located in M.V. Road, Kurseong, Darjeeling, West Bengal.

About college
This polytechnic is affiliated to the West Bengal State Council of Technical Education,  and recognized by AICTE, New Delhi. This polytechnic offers diploma courses in Electrical, Computer Science & Technology, and Civil Engineering.

See also

References

External links
Official website WBSCTE
Darjeeling Polytechnic

Universities and colleges in Darjeeling district
Educational institutions established in 1964
1964 establishments in West Bengal
Technical universities and colleges in West Bengal